The men's 15 kilometre mass start at the 2017 Asian Winter Games was held on February 26, 2017 at the Nishioka Biathlon Stadium.

Schedule
All times are Japan Standard Time (UTC+09:00)

Results
Legend
DNS — Did not start

References

Results

External links
Official website

Men mass start